Arispe is a city in Union County, Iowa, United States. The population was 96 at the 2020 census.
It is closely related to the nearby town of Creston.

Geography
Arispe is located at  (40.949010, -94.218974).

Demographics

2010 census
As of the census of 2010, there were 100 people, 42 households, and 32 families residing in the city. The racial makeup of the city was 100.0% White.

There were 42 households, of which 35.7% had children under the age of 18 living with them, 57.1% were married couples living together, 11.9% had a female householder with no husband present, 7.1% had a male householder with no wife present, and 23.8% were non-families. 19.0% of all households were made up of individuals, and 11.9% had someone living alone who was 65 years of age or older. The average household size was 2.38 and the average family size was 2.66.

The median age in the city was 41 years. 27% of residents were under the age of 18; 7% were between the ages of 18 and 24; 19% were from 25 to 44; 31% were from 45 to 64; and 16% were 65 years of age or older. The gender makeup of the city was 47.0% male and 53.0% female.

2000 census
As of the census of 2000, there were 89 people, 42 households, and 25 families residing in the city. The racial makeup of the city was 100.00% White.

There were 42 households, out of which 21.4% had children under the age of 18 living with them, 59.5% were married couples living together, 2.4% had a female householder with no husband present, and 38.1% were non-families. 35.7% of all households were made up of individuals, and 23.8% had someone living alone who was 65 years of age or older. The average household size was 2.12 and the average family size was 2.77.

In the city, the population was spread out, with 19.1% under the age of 18, 3.4% from 18 to 24, 21.3% from 25 to 44, 23.6% from 45 to 64, and 32.6% who were 65 years of age or older. The median age was 49 years. For every 100 females, there were 85.4 males. For every 100 females age 18 and over, there were 94.6 males.

The median income for a household in the city was $25,000, and the median income for a family was $27,917. Males had a median income of $16,250 versus $14,167 for females. The per capita income for the city was $11,999. There were 17.4% of families and 11.7% of the population living below the poverty line, including no under eighteens and 27.6% of those over 64.

Notable person
 Harold R. Gross, member of the United States House of Representatives in the 20th century.

References

Cities in Iowa
Cities in Union County, Iowa